Kingsley Township is a township in Forest County, Pennsylvania, United States. The population was 291 at the 2020 census, down from 363 in 2010, a figure which was, in turn, an increase from 261 at the 2000 census.

Geography
The township is in the center of Forest County, extending north to the Warren County line and reaching south to a point just north of the Clarion County line. Tionesta Creek, a tributary of the Allegheny River, crosses the township from northeast to southwest and is partially followed by Pennsylvania Route 666. Unincorporated communities in the township include Mayburg, Whig Hill, Kellettville, Crystal Springs, and Starr.

Demographics

As of the census of 2000, there were 261 people, 119 households, and 79 families residing in the township.  The population density was 4.2 people per square mile (1.6/km).  There were 1,294 housing units at an average density of 21.1/sq mi (8.1/km).  The racial makeup of the township was 97.32% White, 0.38% African American, 0.77% Native American, 0.38% from other races, and 1.15% from two or more races. Hispanic or Latino of any race were 0.77% of the population.

There were 119 households, out of which 21.8% had children under the age of 18 living with them, 61.3% were married couples living together, 4.2% had a female householder with no husband present, and 32.8% were non-families. 29.4% of all households were made up of individuals, and 14.3% had someone living alone who was 65 years of age or older.  The average household size was 2.19 and the average family size was 2.70.

In the township the population was spread out, with 19.9% under the age of 18, 1.9% from 18 to 24, 24.5% from 25 to 44, 31.8% from 45 to 64, and 21.8% who were 65 years of age or older.  The median age was 48 years. For every 100 females, there were 110.5 males.  For every 100 females age 18 and over, there were 113.3 males.

The median income for a household in the township was $23,646, and the median income for a family was $24,167. Males had a median income of $31,563 versus $18,333 for females. The per capita income for the township was $12,307.  About 9.4% of families and 14.2% of the population were below the poverty line, including 28.6% of those under the age of eighteen and 2.5% of those sixty five or over.

References

Townships in Forest County, Pennsylvania
Townships in Pennsylvania